Yolanda Hightower (born January 1, 1961) is an American former field hockey player who competed in the 1988 Summer Olympics.

She won the silver medal at the Pan American Games in Indianapolis.
In 2001, Hightower was inducted into the Virginia Sports Hall of Fame.

College 
While at Old Dominion, Hightower won the Honda Award (now the Honda Sports Award) as the nation's best field hockey player for the 1982–83 season.

References

External links
 

1961 births
Living people
American female field hockey players
Olympic field hockey players of the United States
Field hockey players at the 1988 Summer Olympics
Field hockey players at the 1987 Pan American Games
Medalists at the 1987 Pan American Games
Pan American Games silver medalists for the United States
Pan American Games medalists in field hockey
21st-century American women
Old Dominion Monarchs field hockey players